The 2000 Giro d'Italia was the 83rd edition of the Giro d'Italia, one of cycling's Grand Tours. The field consisted of 180 riders, and 127 riders finished the race.

By rider

By nationality

References

2000 Giro d'Italia
2000